Fustius biextuta is a moth of the family Erebidae first described by Michael Fibiger in 2010. It is known from Thailand.

The wingspan is 12–13 mm. The head, patagia, anterior part of tegulae, prothorax, the basal part of the costa, the triangular patch of the medial area, the major part of the subterminal and the terminal area, including the fringes are black. The forewing ground colour is beige suffused with light-brown scales, while the subterminal area has beige-brown patches. The crosslines are hardly visible, except for weak beige subterminal and subterminal lines. The terminal line is marked by black interneural dots. The hindwing is beige, with a narrow brown terminal line and an indistinct discal spot. The fringes are white basally, otherwise beige. The underside of the forewing is grey brown, while the underside of the hindwing is grey.

References

Micronoctuini
Moths described in 2010
Taxa named by Michael Fibiger